Jaanara Jaana (Kannada: ಜಾಣರ ಜಾಣ) is a 1967 Indian Kannada film, directed by B. Satyam and produced by G. Krishna Murthy. The film stars Raja Shankar, M. P. Shankar, Vanisri and Shylashri in the lead roles. The film has musical score by G. K. Venkatesh.

Cast
Raja Shankar
M. P. Shankar
Vanisri
Shylashri
R. Nagendra Rao
Narasimharaju

References

1960s Kannada-language films
Films scored by G. K. Venkatesh